Joseph Oleg Sandulo (5 May 1931 – 13 December 2019) was a Canadian boxer. He competed in the men's flyweight event at the 1948 Summer Olympics.

References

1931 births
2019 deaths
Canadian male boxers
Olympic boxers of Canada
Boxers at the 1948 Summer Olympics
Sportspeople from Ottawa
Flyweight boxers